Salvatierra Castle is a fortification near Calzada de Calatrava in the south of the province of Ciudad Real, Castilla-La Mancha in Spain.

History
After the Battle of Alarcos in which the Order of Calatrava was defeated by the Almohad Caliphate, the scattered remains of Castilian knights sheltered in the Cistercian monastery of Cirvelos, and there began to regroup and expand. They erected Salvatierra Castle as a new bulwark, where they took the name the Knights of Salvatierra (1198) for the following 14 years. But Salvatierra itself fell to the Almohads in 1209.

References 

Buildings and structures completed in the 10th century
Buildings and structures in the Province of Ciudad Real
Orders of chivalry of Spain
Castles in Castilla–La Mancha